VV Smitshoek is a football club from Barendrecht, Netherlands. It plays in the Saturday Hoofdklasse since 2016.

History
The Voetbalvereniging Smitshoek was founded on 23 June 1960.

In 2005, a Smitshoek game against VV BMT from The Hague evolved into a physical fight.

Since 2012, Smitshoek plays in the Hoofdklasse, with the exception of 2015–16 back in the Eerste Klasse. In 2016, Smitshoek won an Eerste Klasse championship at an eight-point advantage on its next competitor.

Chief coaches 
 Cees van Bennekom (1976–1978)
 Cees Brussaard (1978–1980)
 Harry Camijn (1980–1982)
 Daan den Bleijker (1982–1988)
 Jan van Baaren (1988–1990)
 Rob Theuns (1990–1991)
 Jan van der Meer (1991–199?)
 René Blaauwkamp (1993?–1995)
 Piet Schuitenmaker (1995)
 Jan de Gier (1995–2001)
 Ab van Wijk (2001–2003)
 Hans de Rover (2003–2008)
 Hans Maus (2008–2010)
 Raymond Frehe (2010–2017)
 Richard Middelkoop (2017–2020)
 Edwin de Koning (since 2020)

References

External links
 

Football clubs in the Netherlands
Football clubs in Barendrecht
Association football clubs established in 1960
1960 establishments in the Netherlands